= Aspergillus costaricaensis =

Scientific classification
- Kingdom: Fungi
- Division: Ascomycota
- Class: Eurotiomycetes
- Order: Eurotiales
- Family: Aspergillaceae
- Genus: Aspergillus
- Species: A. costaricaensis

Binomial name
- Aspergillus costaricaensis Samson & Frisvad (2004)

Species of fungus

Aspergillus costaricaensis is a species of fungus in the genus Aspergillus. A. costaricaensis belongs to the group of black Aspergilli that are used in industry to create enzymes and other products. A. costaricaensis belongs to the Nigri section. The species was first described in 2004. It has been found in soil in Gaugin Garden on Taboga Island, Costa Rica. It produces large pink to greyish brown sclerotia.

The genome of A. costaricaensis was sequenced and published in 2014 as part of the Aspergillus whole-genome sequencing project – a project dedicated to performing whole-genome sequencing of all members of the genus Aspergillus. The genome assembly size was 36.95 Mbp.

== Growth and morphology ==
Aspergillus costaricaensis has been cultivated on both Czapek yeast extract agar (CYA) plates and Malt Extract Agar Oxoid® (MEAOX) plates. The growth morphology of the colonies can be seen in the pictures below.

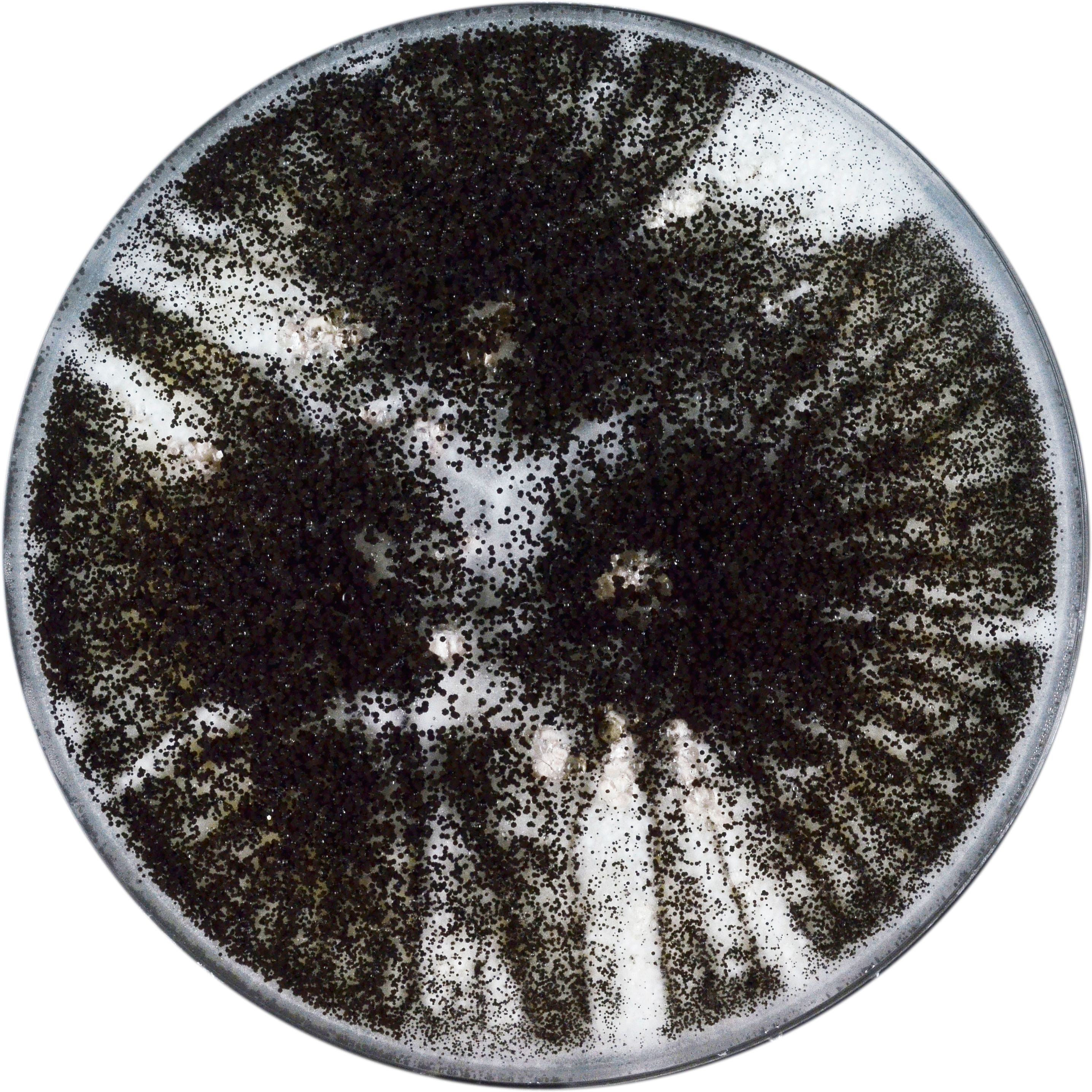
Aspergillus costaricaensis growing on CYA plate

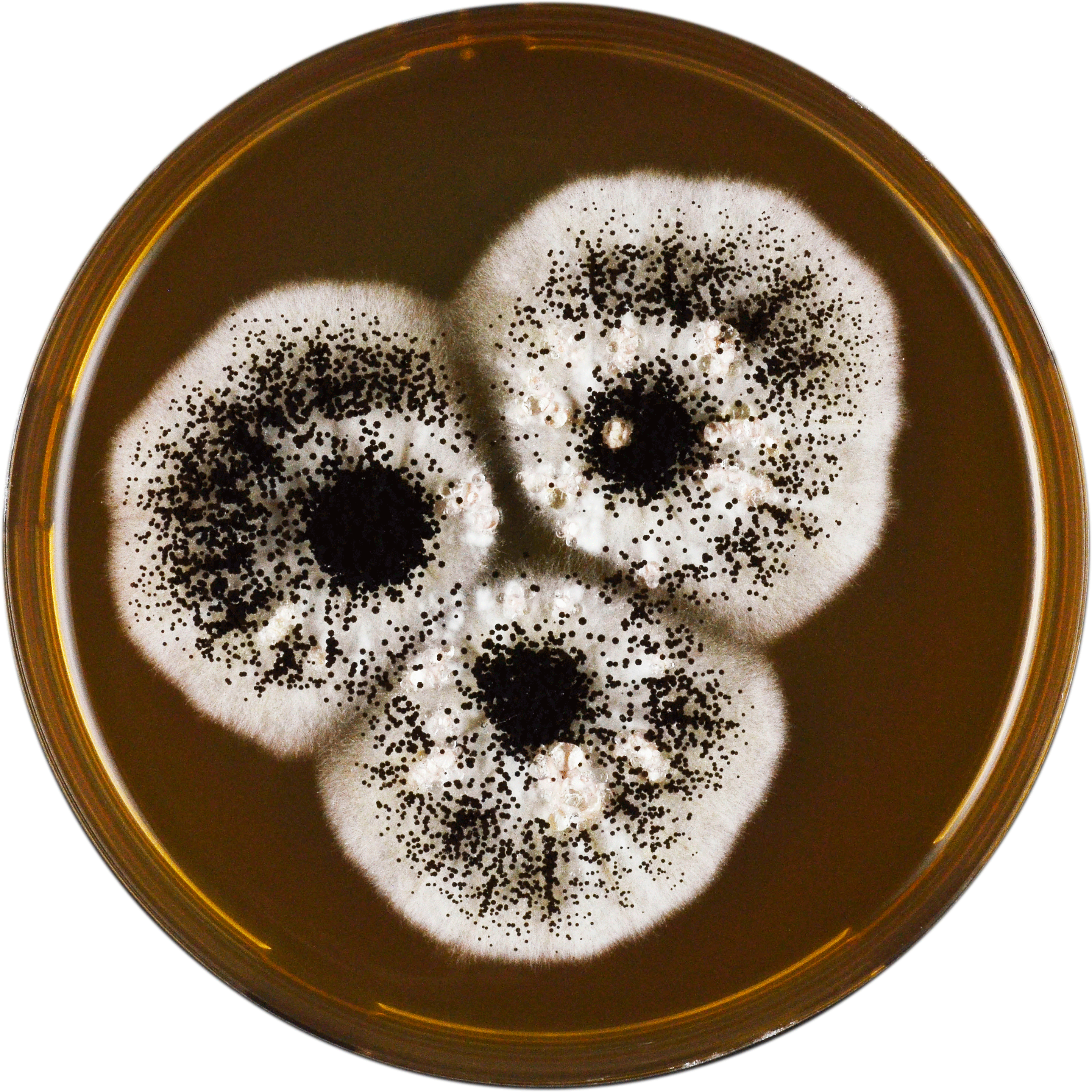
Aspergillus costaricaensis growing on MEAOX plate
